Roger Richebé (3 December 1897, Marseille - 10 July 1989 in Ville-d'Avray), born Roger Gustave Richebé, was a French film director, screenwriter, and producer.

Selected filmography
  (1930)  (producer) 
 La donna di una notte (1930) (producer) 
 On purge bébé (1931) (producer - uncredited) 
 Queen of the Night (1931)
 La Chienne (1931) (producer - as Les Etablissement Branuberger-Richebé) 
 Mam'zelle Nitouche (1931) (producer)
 American Love (1931) (producer)
 Fantômas (1932) (producer)
 Fanny (1932) (producer)
 The Agony of the Eagles (1933) (director)
 Minuit, place Pigalle (1934) (director)
 J'ai une idée (1934) (director)
 Koenigsmark (1935) (producer)
 L'amant de Madame Vidal (1936) (producer)
 The Secret of Polichinelle (1936) (producer)
 Le mort en fuite (1936) (producer)
 The Green Jacket (1937) (producer)
 The Cheat (1937) (producer)
 A Picnic on the Grass (1937) (producer)
 Women's Prison (1938) (writer)
 La Tradition de minuit (1939) (writer)
 Happy Days (1941) (producer)
 Madame Sans-Gêne (1941) (writer and producer)
 Romance à trois (1942) (writer and producer)
 Monsieur La Souris (1942) (producer) 
 Angels of Sin (1943) (producer) 
 Domino (1943) (director)
 Voyage Without Hope (1943) (producer) 
 Les J3 (1946) (producer) 
 La Grande Maguet (1947) (director)
 Jean de la Lune (1949) (producer) 
 Monseigneur (1949) (writer and producer)
 Gigolo (1951) (producer)  
 Gibier de potence (1951) (director)
 Clara de Montargis (1951) (producer) 
 La Fugue de Monsieur Perle (1952) (co-director and co-writer)
 The Lovers of Midnight (1953) (producer)
 The Little Czar (1954) (producer)
 Sophie et le crime (1955) (producer)
 The Wages of Sin (1956) (producer)
 Élisa (1957) (director)
 Que les hommes sont bêtes'' (1957) (writer and producer)

External links
 

French film directors
French male screenwriters
20th-century French screenwriters
Mass media people from Marseille
1897 births
1989 deaths
20th-century French male writers